Webb Island is a rocky island in Antarctica, 1.5 nautical miles (2.8 km) long, lying in Laubeuf Fjord about 3 nautical miles (6 km) south of the entrance to Stonehouse Bay, close to Adelaide Island. It was discovered by the French Antarctic Expedition under Jean Baptiste Charcot, 1908–10, and named by him for Captain (later Admiral Sir) Richard C. Webb of the Royal Navy, commanding officer of an English cruiser in Argentine waters at that time.

See also 
 List of Antarctic and sub-Antarctic islands

Islands of Adelaide Island